South Africa’s National Research Foundation (NRF) is the intermediary agency between the policies and strategies of the Government of South Africa and South Africa's research institutions.

It was established on 1 April 1999 as an autonomous statutory body in accordance with the National Research Foundation Act. Dr Fulufhelo Nelwamondo has been appointed as Chief Executive Officer of the National Research Foundation of South Africa with effect from 1 April 2021. The NRF Board is chaired by Dr Nompumelelo Obokoh.

Functions
The NRF has three main functions: 
to support research and innovation, through its agency, Research and Innovation Support and Advancement (RISA); 
to encourage an interest in science and technology through its business unit, the South African Agency for Science and Technology Advancement (SAASTA); 
 to facilitate high-end research through its National Research Facilities (South African Institute for Aquatic Biodiversity; Hartebeesthoek Radio Astronomy Observatory; iThemba Laboratory for Accelerator Based Sciences; South African Astronomical Observatory; Hermanus Magnetic Observatory; National Zoological Gardens of South Africa)

One of the NRF’s key objectives is to ensure appropriately qualified people and high-level infrastructure to produce the knowledge that makes South Africa a global competitor. Its "focus areas" are: 
Research and Innovation Support
Astro/Space/Geo Sciences
Biodiversity / Conservation
Nuclear Sciences
Advancing Science

Unlike other Science Councils whose role is research performance, the NRF primarily fulfils an agency role, with a smaller portion of its activity allocated to actual research. Funding from the NRF is largely directed towards academic research, developing high-level human resources, and supporting the National Research Facilities, although beneficiaries include students, and private individuals or companies. KZN Literary Tourism is a project which has received funding through the NRF.

Centres of Excellence
In 2004 the NRF founded seven Centres of Excellence (COE), which aim to facilitate inter-disciplinary research with the aim of enhancing research and capacity building. Additional COEs have been added since:
CoE for Integrated Mineral and Energy Resource Analysis
CoE in Human Development
CoE in Food Security 
CoE in Scientometrics and STI Policy (2014): The Nodal Head is Rasigan Maharajh.
CoE in Mathematical and Statistical Sciences
Centre of Excellence in Palaeosciences
The National Institute for Theoretical Physics
Centre of Excellence in Epidemiology Modelling and Analysis
Applied Centre for Climate and Earth Systems Science (ACCESS)
Centre of Excellence in Tree Health Biotechnology
Centre of Excellence for Biomedical Tuberculosis Research
Centre of Excellence in Catalysis
Centre of Excellence in Birds as Key to Biodiversity Conservation
Centre of Excellence in Strong Materials
Centre of Excellence for Invasion Biology

See also
Department of Science and Technology (South Africa)
Council for Scientific and Industrial Research
Human Sciences Research Council (South Africa)
 Open access in South Africa and List of South African open access repositories

References

External links
 Website
 Facebook
 Twitter

 

Foundations based in South Africa
Research institutes in South Africa
Members of the International Council for Science
Members of the International Science Council